Chanda Sasanudu is a 1983 Indian Telugu-language action film, produced and directed by N. T. Rama Rao on his Ramakrishna Cine Studios banner. Starring Rama Rao and Radha, with music composed by Chakravarthy, this was the last film which Rama Rao acted in before he became the Chief Minister of Andhra Pradesh. The film was a box office hit, and was remade in Tamil as Sarithira Nayagan.

Plot

Cast 
N. T. Rama Rao as Hari Chandra Prasad and Raja
Radha as Rani
Rao Gopal Rao as Venkatesh / Venkataiah
Satyanarayana as Appa Rao / Appigadu
Jaggayya as Satyam
Rallapalli as Karanam
Chalapathi Rao as Dasu
Narra Venkateswara Rao  as C.B.I.Official
K.K.Sharma as Police Inspector
Sharada as Bhuvaneswari Devi
Annapurna as Rajyalakshmi
Kavitha as Jayasri
Jayamalini as Parijatham

Soundtrack 
Music composed by Chakravarthy. Lyrics were written by C. Narayana Reddy.

Reception 
Amarnath K Menon wrote for India Today, "The film, although it is a sloppy patchwork quilt of stunts and sentiment, will still pull in NTR fans, trained as they are, to his cosmetic realism, stereotypes and cliches."

References

External links 
 

1983 action films
1983 films
Films directed by N. T. Rama Rao
Films scored by K. Chakravarthy
Films with screenplays by the Paruchuri brothers
Indian action films
Telugu films remade in other languages